Trinchesia macquariensis is a species of sea slug, an aeolid nudibranch, a marine gastropod mollusc in the family Trinchesiidae.

Distribution
This species was described from Buckles Bay, Macquarie Island, .

Description 
The adult size of this species is up to 5 mm in length.

References

External links
  Valdés Á., Moran A.L. & Woods H.A. (2012) Revision of several poorly known Antarctic aeolid nudibranch species (Mollusca: Gastropoda), with the description of a new species. Journal of the Marine Biological Association of the United Kingdom 92(5): 1161-1174

Trinchesiidae
Gastropods described in 1973